The Boston College Eagles were represent Boston College in Women's Hockey East Association play during the 2016–17 NCAA Division I women's ice hockey season.

Offseason
July 29: Six current members of the Eagles roster were invited to participate at the 2016 USA Hockey Women’s National Festival in Lake Placid, New York: Grace Bizal (D), Katie Burt (G), Kali Flanagan (D), Megan Keller (D), Caitrin Lonergan (F) and Makenna Newkirk (F).

July 20: Krystin Capizzano was invited to participate at the 2016 Team Canada Camp, held in Calgary, Alberta.

Recruiting

Roster

2016–17 Eagles

Schedule

|-
!colspan=12 style=""| Regular Season
 
 
 

|-
!colspan=12 style=""| WHEA Tournament 
     
   
      
     
|-
!colspan=12 style=""| NCAA Tournament

Awards and honors

Caitrin Lonergan, Hockey East Rookie of the Month, October and November, 2016

Andie Anastos, Hockey East Player of the Month, December, 2016

Delaney Belinskas, Hockey East Rookie of the Month, December, 2016

Makenna Newkirk, Hockey East Co-Player of the Month, January, 2017

Katie Burt, Hockey East Goaltender of the Month, January and February, 2017

Megan Keller, Hockey East Player of the Month, February, 2017

Megan Keller, WHEA Best Defender, WHEA Player of the Year

Hockey East All-Stars

Delaney Belinskas (Forward), Hockey East Pro-Ambitions All-Rookie Team

Caitrin Lonergan (Forward), Hockey East Pro-Ambitions All-Rookie Team

References

Boston College
Boston College Eagles women's ice hockey seasons
NCAA women's ice hockey Frozen Four seasons
Boston College Eagles women's ice hockey season
Boston College Eagles women's ice hockey season
Boston College Eagles women's ice hockey season
Boston College Eagles women's ice hockey season